Blodgett is an English family-surname, so far as records and history establish it. Back of the English generations, there is some conjecture about its origin. Several researchers claim a French-Norman descent for the name, and point out that one Robert Bloct (Blojet or Bloyet) was a Norman bishop in the service of William the Conqueror. Robert came to England during the Norman Conquest and was appointed Bishop of Lincoln. Other research suggests a French Huguenot ancestry. In England there are definite early records for the family, from the fifteenth through the seventeenth centuries, in the eastern area of England north of London.

In the United States, the entire Blodgett family, from all available records, descends from one English couple. Thomas Blodgett, born in 1604, emigrated to America in 1635 with his wife Susan.  Thomas was born on November 18, 1604, in Stowmarket, Suffolk County. England, and settled with Susan in Cambridge in the Massachusetts Bay Colony. The couple became active residents of their new town, and had at least seven children. Today, the great majority of Blodgetts, worldwide, live in the United States. Members of the family reside in all levels of society, and in all areas of the country.

There is an oven company by the name Blodgett. 

Notable people with this surname include:

Cindy Blodgett (born 1975) US basketball player
Delos A. Blodgett (1825–1909) Lumberman, capitalist, and father of John W. Blodgett
E.D. Blodgett (born 1934) Canadian writer
Gary Blodgett (1937–2021) US physician and politician
Geoffrey Blodgett (1931–2001) US historian
Henry Williams Blodgett (1821–1905) United States federal judge
John W. Blodgett (1860–1951) US banker, lumberman, and philanthropist
Joseph Haygood Blodgett (1858–1934), American architect and contractor
Katharine Burr Blodgett (1898–1979) Physicist
Michael Blodgett (1939–2007) US actor
Minnie Cumnock Blodgett (1862–1931) US activist, worked for children's health and welfare, and Vassar benefactor
Polly Blodgett (1919–2018) US figure skater
Rufus Blodgett (1834–1910) US politician
Samuel Blodgett (1724–1807) US lawyer, industrialist, and financier
Timothy Blodgett (1740–1831) Farmer, and Minuteman at the Battle of Lexington, 1775
Timothy Blodgett (born 1966) Law Enforcement Officer, and Sergeant at Arms of the United States House of Representatives, 2021

Fictional characters:
Esther Blodgett, main character in the film A Star Is Born (1954 film)

References

English families